Salehabad Rural District may refer to:
 Salehabad Rural District (Hamadan Province)
 Salehabad Rural District (Razavi Khorasan Province)
 Salehabad Rural District (Baharestan County), Tehran province

See also
 Salehabad District (disambiguation)